The 2013–14 Wichita State Shockers men's basketball team represented Wichita State University in the 2013–14 NCAA Division I men's basketball season. They played their home games at Charles Koch Arena, which had a capacity of 10,506. They were in their 69th season as a member of the Missouri Valley Conference. They were led by seventh-year head coach Gregg Marshall. They were the last team to finish the regular season and enter the NCAA tournament unbeaten until Kentucky did it the next year.

The 2013–14 season was arguably the best season in Wichita State's 108-year basketball history. After defeating Missouri State on March 1, 2014, Wichita State became the first men's Division I team ever to finish the regular season 31–0 (Kentucky matched it the next year), the first team to finish 18–0 in conference play in the Missouri Valley Conference since the 1985–86 Bradley Braves, as well as the first to finish the regular season undefeated since Saint Joseph's in 2003–04. The team's 35–0 start was the best men's Division I start ever (before Kentucky started 38-0 the next year), beating the 1990–91 UNLV Runnin' Rebels who began the season 34–0 and the best Missouri Valley Conference start ever, beating the 1978–79 Indiana State Sycamores, who went 33–0 to start the season. They spent most of the season in the top 10 of both major polls, rising as high as #2 in late February.  They continued their run by winning their first MVC tournament title since 1987, and were ranked second in both final major media polls, the highest final national ranking in school history. Though some analysts noted that Wichita State's schedule was relatively easy compared to previous teams that finished the regular season primarily because none of their opponents throughout the season were ranked when they played them, as well as only beating one opponent that was ranked at any point in the season (Saint Louis, who also had a lack of quality wins).

They entered the 2014 NCAA Division I men's basketball tournament undefeated at 34–0. The Shockers beat Cal Poly, 64–37. Two days later, and playing their 5th and final straight game at St. Louis' Scottrade Center, Fred VanVleet's three-point attempt at the end-of-game buzzer against Kentucky bounced harmlessly off the rim, and so went their attempt to become the first men's team in 38 years to win the title undefeated.

Preseason
In the 2012–13 college basketball season, the Wichita State University Shockers, under sixth-year head coach Gregg Marshall, finished the season 30–9 and 12–6 in Missouri Valley play to finish in second place. They advanced to the championship game of the Missouri Valley Tournament where they lost to Creighton. They received an at-large bid to the 2013 NCAA Tournament, receiving a 9 seed in the West Region, where they defeated 8 seed Pittsburgh and 1 seed Gonzaga to advance to the Sweet Sixteen. In the West Region semifinals they defeated 13 seed La Salle and 2 seed Ohio State in the regional finals to be crowned West Region Champions and advance to the Final Four for the second time in school history and first time since 1965. In the Final Four, they lost to eventual-champion Louisville, 72–68. Wichita State was ranked #4 in the final Coach's Poll of the 2012-13 season.

Departures

Class of 2013 recruits

Roster

Schedule

|-
!colspan=12 style="background:#000; color:#FFC318;"| Exhibition
|-

|-
!colspan=12 style="background:#000; color:#FFC318;"| Non-conference regular season
|-

|-
!colspan=12 style="background:#000; color:#FFC318;"| Missouri Valley Conference regular season
|-

|-
!colspan=12 style="background:#000; color:#FFC318;"| Missouri Valley Tournament
|-

|-
!colspan=12 style="background:#000; color:#FFC318;"| NCAA tournament
|-

Honors
Fred VanVleet was named one of the ten semi-finalists for the Naismith College Player of the Year Award. Cleanthony Early was named one of fifteen finalists for both the Oscar Robertson Award and the John R. Wooden Award.  Early has earned 2014 NCAA Men's Basketball All-American second team recognition from the United States Basketball Writers Association, National Association of Basketball Coaches (NABC), NBC Sports, and USA Today as well as third team recognition from the Associated Press (AP) and honorable mention recognition from Bleacher Report. Early also earned John R. Wooden Award All-American Team recognition. VanVleet was a second team selection by Sports Illustrated and Bleacher Report, and he earned third team All-American recognition from Sporting News and NABC as well as honorable mention recognition from AP.

Rankings

References

Wichita State Shockers men's basketball seasons
Wichita State
Wichita State
Wichita State Shockers men's basketball
Shock